Hoja may refer to:

 Höja, a locality in Ängelholm Municipality, Sweden
 Höja, Malmö, a neighbourhood of Malmö, Sweden
 Hoja or Hodja, a Turkish honorific

See also 
 La Hoja Digital, a newspaper in Paraguay
 Hoia (disambiguation)
 Hojai